The Samoan Government is generally conservative and pro-Western, with a strong interest in regional political and economic issues. Samoa participated in a first round of negotiations with its Pacific Island neighbors for a regional trade agreement in August 2000. In January 2009, Samoa opened embassies in China and Japan.

Diplomatic relations

Countries having diplomatic relations with Samoa:

Bilateral relations

Samoa and the Commonwealth of Nations

Western Samoa joined the Commonwealth of Nations in 1970.

International organization participation 

ACP, AsDB, C, ESCAP, FAO, G-77, IBRD, ICAO, ICC, ICFTU, ICRM, IDA, IFAD, IFC, IFRCS, IMF, IMO, Intelsat (nonsignatory user), IOC, ITU, OPCW, PIF, Sparteca, SPC, SOPAC, SPREP, UN, UNCTAD, UNESCO, UPU, WHO, WIPO, WMO.

Regional integration

Samoan Prime Minister Tuilaepa Sailele Malielegaoi has pushed through a variety of legislation to increase links between Samoa and the Pacific regional powers of Australia and New Zealand. Under his leadership the country switched to driving on the left, decided to shift westwards across the international date line and adopted daylight saving time, and proposed the introduction of a common Pacific currency.

In late 2011, Tuilaepa Sailele Malielegaoi initiated a meeting of Polynesian leaders which led, in November, to the formal launching of the Polynesian Leaders Group, a regional grouping intended to cooperate on a variety of issues including culture and language, education, responses to climate change, and trade and investment. The Group was in part a response to the Melanesian Spearhead Group.

See also

 List of diplomatic missions in Samoa
 List of diplomatic missions of Samoa
 Samoan passport
 Visa policy of Samoa
 Visa requirements for Samoan citizens
 Kaimiloa, a ship of the Kingdom of Hawaii that attempted to establish relations between Hawaii and Samoa.

References

 
Samoa and the Commonwealth of Nations